F.T.F.O.M.F. (an acronym for Fuck The Fuck Off Mother Fucker) is the second solo studio album by American rapper Shaggy 2 Dope. It was released in 2017 through Psychopathic Records. Production was handled by DJ Clay and Shaggy 2 Dope himself. It features the lone guest appearance from Violent J. The album debuted at No. 72 on the US Billboard 200, No. 39 on the Top R&B/Hip-Hop Albums, No. 18 on the Top Album Sales and topped the Independent Albums chart.

A music video for "Tell These Bitches" was published the day before the album release, while the music video for "The Knife" was released on February 10, 2018. The song "Psychopathic Soldier" is a diss track aimed at Majik Ninja Entertainment.

Tour 
Shaggy 2 Dope (accompaying by Ouija Macc) embarked on a US concert tour, F.T.F.O.M.F. Tour, in support of the album. The first show took place on December 31, 2018 at the Foundry Concert Club in Lakewood, OH, and ended on February 16, 2019 at House of Blues in New Orleans, LA. Also on this tour, the rapper's second extended play Gloomy Sunday was available for purchase.

Track listing

Personnel 
 Joseph "Shaggy 2 Dope" Utsler – lyrics, vocals, producer, arranger
 Joseph "Violent J" Bruce – lyrics & vocals (track 8)
 Michael "DJ Clay" Velasquez – producer, arranger, recording, mixing
 Jim Kissling – mastering
 Domaine – additional engineering
 Nicky the Beard – additional engineering
 Little Jimmy G – additional engineering
 Matt Fenner – design
 Gary Alford – artwork

Charts

Release history

References

External links 

2017 albums
Sequel albums
Shaggy 2 Dope albums
Psychopathic Records albums